Dark Matters is the eighteenth studio album by British rock band the Stranglers, released on 10 September 2021 through Coursegood. It features the playing of keyboardist Dave Greenfield, who died in 2020. It is also the first studio album recorded without founding drummer Jet Black, who retired from performing with the band in 2015.

Dark Matters entered the United Kingdom's Official Albums Chart at number 4, the highest-placed studio album by the Stranglers since Feline in 1983. It was awarded "Album of the Year" by Vive Le Rock magazine in its December 2021 issue.

Background and recording

Dark Matters is the first Stranglers studio album since 2012's Giants and the first since the death of keyboardist Dave Greenfield in May 2020. The track, "And If You Should See Dave...", was written by bassist and singer Jean-Jacques Burnel as a tribute to Greenfield. Greenfield features on eight of the album's 11 tracks, with the remainder being completed by other band members remotely due to COVID-19 restrictions. The album was recorded over the course of two years with long-time producer Louie Nicastro, mainly at the Stranglers' own studio near Bath in Somerset and Mark Gardener's OX4 Sound Studios in Oxford. Additional recording was done at guitarist Baz Warne's home studio in Yorkshire and at a studio near Burnel's home in the south of France.

Burnel's "If Something's Gonna Kill Me (It Might as Well Be Love)", which also includes a lyrical tribute to Greenfield, was arranged by Warne as a Kraftwerk-inspired electro-pop track, complete with keyboard bass and programmed drums. To create the song, Nicastro, who played the keyboard parts, used only keyboards that Greenfield would have used in the early days of the Stranglers, such as Oberheim, PPG Wave and Minimoog synthesizers. The third post-Greenfield track, "The Lines", is a one-take recording featuring Burnel on acoustic guitar and Warne on lead vocals, with keyboards added later on.

Dark Matters also marks the first Stranglers studio album since original drummer Jet Black stepped away from active performances in 2015. Black does not perform on the album, but is thanked in the album's sleeve notes. He is replaced by long-time touring drummer Jim Macaulay.

"This Song" is a cover of the track "This Song Will Get Me Over You" by the band the Disciples of Spess, but is co-credited to the Stranglers; the music video features the former England footballer Stuart Pearce, a long-time fan of the band.

Track listing 

A bonus CD, Dave Greenfield – A Tribute, was issued with pre-orders made through the Stranglers' official store. It features eight previously unreleased live recordings selected by the band, celebrating Greenfield's talent. It includes four of the Stranglers songs that Greenfield performed lead vocals on: "Dead Ringer", "Peasant in the Big Shitty", "Do You Wanna?" and "Four Horsemen".

Personnel
Credits adapted from the album liner notes, except where noted.

The Stranglers
 Jean-Jacques Burnel – bass, lead (1, 3, 8, 10, 11) and backing vocals, acoustic guitar (6)
 Dave Greenfield – keyboards, backing vocals
 Baz Warne – guitar, lead (2-7, 9) and backing vocals
 Jim Macaulay – drums, percussion, backing vocals
Additional musicians
 Louie Nicastro – additional keyboards
 Matthew Bourne-Jones – trumpet (4)
Technical
 Louie Nicastro – producer, engineer
 Phil Johnson – sleeve design, art direction

Charts

References

2021 albums
Albums postponed due to the COVID-19 pandemic
The Stranglers albums